Dobrești is a commune in Bihor County, Crișana, Romania with a population of 5,260 people (2011). It is composed of eight villages: Cornișești (Nagykerpesd), Crâncești (Karáncsfalva), Dobrești, Hidișel (Nánhegyes), Luncasprie (Lankás), Răcaș (Lankástanya), Topa de Jos (Alsótopa), and Topa de Sus (Felsőtopa).

Geography
Dobrești is situated in the foothills of the Pădurea Craiului Mountains. It lies on the banks of the river Holod, and its right tributary, the river Topa; the river Valea lui Vasile flows into the Topa in Hidișel village.

Economy
The Dobrești mine is located on the territory of the commune. Opened in 1965, the mine, which employed 2,000 workers, produced 140,000 tonnes of bauxite per year; the mine closed in 1999.

References

Communes in Bihor County
Localities in Crișana
Mining communities in Romania